The Korg Trinity is a synthesizer music workstation released by Korg in 1995. It was also the first workstation to offer modular expansion for not only sounds, but also studio-grade feature such as ADAT, various sound engine processors, audio recording capability, and more. It was considered one of the most comprehensive music workstations, in term of features, at the time.

Ex-Dream Theater keyboardist Derek Sherinian in collaboration with KORG sound designer Jack Hotop created Sherinian's signature guitaristic lead sound on the Trinity in 1996.

The Korg Triton succeeded the Korg Trinity in 1999.

Models
There are 5 models and variations of both the main hardware synthesizer itself and a rackmount:
 Trinity (61 Key)
 Trinity Plus (61 keys + SOLO-TRI board)
 Trinity Pro (76 Key)
 Trinity Pro X (88 Weighted Key)
 Trinity V3 (61 keys + MOSS board)
 Trinity TR-Rack: 1U Rack-mount Expanded Memory Locations (adds banks C+D to Program and Combination modes) the same as Trinity with the PBS-TRI Board, but no sample loading facility, but does add digital in and out jacks.

Variations
Any of the models could have the following variations:

 Trinity:  The basic 61-key Trinity synthesizer with ACCESS synth engine, and no MOSS boards (Prophecy or Z1) installed.
 Trinity Plus: Same as the Trinity, a 61-key synthesizer, however, with the SOLO-TRI Prophecy board installed (the "S" bank), using any Trinity OS below 3.00
 Trinity Pro:  Same as the Trinity Plus, but with a 76-key keyboard (including the SOLO-TRI Prophecy board installed).
 Trinity ProX:  Same as the Trinity Plus, but with an 88-key keyboard with piano action type (including the SOLO-TRI Prophecy board installed).
 Trinity V3: is not only OS 3.x, but shipped with the "MOSS-TRI" Z1 board installed (the "M" bank).
 SOLO-TRI: only works with OS 1 – 2.x and NOT 3.x, and the MOSS-TRI only works with 3.x and above.  These cards cannot be installed at the same time as they occupy the same expansion bay.
 HDR-TRI: and SCSI-TRI cannot be installed at the same time as they occupy the same bay.  (The HDR-TRI has all the feature of the SCSI-TRI)
 Any Trinity can have OS 3.x installed even if the MOSS-TRI is not installed but #3 applies.  (The OS is user up and downgradable using floppies)
 The TR-Rack could be fitted with the DI-TRI option, which is an ADAT format-compatible digital output. This enables one to send the four audio output signals digitally to any mixer, signal processor, computer card or recorder equipped with this interface.
 There was a Limited Edition Black Trinity plus made only for the Japanese market.  Very little is known about this variant, or even how many were made.

Features
The Trinity workstation features a massive set of effects (100 Insert effects & 14 Master effects), a large graphic touchscreen (320x240) and a complete 16-track sequencer, as well as second optional add-on sound generation system:
 ACCESS (Advanced Control Combined Synthesis System). A PCM-based sound synthesis with 16 bit 48 kHz PCM playback on a 24 Mbyte ROM. However, since 2:1 data compression has been used, these are equivalent to 48 Mbyte of samples held in conventional RAM. The PCM data includes well over 1,000 individual samples comprising 374 multisamples.
 MOSS (Multi-Oscillator Synthesis System). The sound generation system of the Korg Prophecy and Z1 with: analogue modelling, VPM (Korg's version of FM synthesis) and physical modelling (brass, reed, plucked string, bowed string, organ, electric piano modelling).

Along with the Korg Prophecy, the Korg Trinity synthesizer was a descendant of the original OASYS synthesizer, an acronym for "Open Architecture Synthesis System", which was a mega-synth prototype that the company previewed in 1994 but never marketed. The foundation of the system was an open concept DSP system where the OS could load various unrelated models of different synthesis and physical modelling sound generators. It was a multiple digital signal processor (DSP) architecture, with the entire system clocking in at over 900 million instructions per second. Korg later adapted some of the core technologies and released three initial products: Trinity, Prophecy and Wavedrum.

Options for the machine included:

 SCSI-TRI: allowed a use to connect SCSI removable storage (ZIP, CDROM, HD) to load/save PCG, Sequencer and Sample Data (last only if PBS-TRI installed).
 PBS-TRI: (PlayBack Sampler) allowed the user to expand the PCM ROM with up 8 Mbyte of additional samples (limited to a maximum of 2MB per individual sample) with the ability to run these samples via the Internal FX processors. With the PBS board the Trinity can load Akai (S1000 & S3000), Wave format file(.Wav), AIFF(.AIF) and 16 bit Korg native format sample files (.KSF). In this last case the memory capacity is equivalent to 16 Mbyte due to the 2:1 data compression. Furthermore, this option doubled the Trinity's User editable program capacity by adding 2 additional banks in Combi and Program modes(Total of 512 programs and 512 combis), doubled the drum kits, and added another 64 sounds (total of 128) if the SOLO-TRI or MOSS-TRI options are installed. A very useful feature of the PBS board is that its memory is non volatile flash RAM, meaning that once samples are loaded they would still be retained in memory even after switching the Trinity off, although also creating longer loading times and the requirement of complete memory erasure to remove any samples.
 HDR-TRI: (Hard Disk Recorder) a very exciting option at the time, not only gave functionality of the SCSI-TRI, but gave the system 2 analogue inputs, S/PDIF digital in and out and for the first time ever,  gave the ability to record/playback up to 4 digital audio tracks perfectly synchronized to the sequencer's 16 MIDI tracks.   The 4 audio tracks were fully automatable with Volume, Pan, 2 Aux sends to the Trinity's existing Master Effects section and simple Lo/Hi EQ. A 540 Mbyte hard disk allowed approximately 47 minutes of stereo recording.
 DI-TRI: (Digital Interface) added a 48 kHz word clock input and ADAT optical output.  The main problem with the Trinity and digital linking at the time, was that Korg chose to design the synth using a 48 kHz, which is very common for post production and television work,  but not the 44.1 kHz CD standard that most studios pro and consumer alike utilized.  Therefore,  it was difficult to clock unless an outboard box calculated a real-time conversion.   Only the first four channels of the ADAT spec were used,  and they were assigned to the classic Korg Output layout:  1/L, 2/R, out 3, out 4.  These were fixed and non-assignable.
 SOLO-TRI: added a Korg Prophecy synthesizer into the Trinity, a 1-voice monophonic synth and integrated effects.  The user could use only one patch at a time like the real synth counterpart, but could incorporate a patch into an existing combination or sequence.  Access to the Trinity's Effect and Master Section was integrated additionally to the Prophecy effects.  The only feature that was sadly not included was the arpeggiator, which was later seen on the future Triton series, Z1, and beyond.
 MOSS-TRI: Incorporated in V3 of the Trinity was the functionality of a Korg Z1 6-voice polyphonic synthesizer. The sound engine is similar to the real Korg Z1 without its arpeggiator and his own integrated effects. The user could use only one patch at a time (instead of 6 on Z1). However, this patch could be incorporated into an existing combination or sequence. Access to the Trinity's Effect and Master Section was integrated as the only way to apply effects to the sound.

Notable users

See also
 Korg Triton, commercially successful successor to the Trinity

References

Further reading

External links
 Korg official site
 The Trinity Haven (Internet Archive)

T
Music workstations